That Dangerous Age (German: Das gefährliche Alter) is a 1927 German silent film directed by Eugen Illés and starring Asta Nielsen, Bernhard Goetzke and Hans Wassmann.

The film's art direction was by Gustav A. Knauer.

Cast
 Asta Nielsen as Elsie seine Frau  
 Bernhard Goetzke as Richard Lindtner U-Prof.  
 Hans Wassmann as Wellmann  
 Trude Hesterberg as Lilly seine Frau  
 Walter Rilla as Jörgen - Student  
 Hans Adalbert Schlettow as Axel - Student 
 Maria Paudler as Magna - Studentin  
 Lucie Höflich as Köchin Tob  
 Ernst Rückert as Chauffeur  
 Adolphe Engers as Mr.Pierre  
 Ressel Orla as Resi Kellnerin  
 Hermann Vallentin as Jensen ein Fischer  
 Josefine Dora as Wirtin  
 Lilian Weiß as Nelly eine Zofe

References

Bibliography
 Hans-Michael Bock and Tim Bergfelder. The Concise Cinegraph: An Encyclopedia of German Cinema. Berghahn Books.

External links

1927 films
Films of the Weimar Republic
Films directed by Eugen Illés
German silent feature films
German black-and-white films